The Country Women's Association (CWA) is the largest regional and rural advocacy group in Australia. It comprises seven independent State and Territory Associations, who are passionate advocates for country women and their families, working tirelessly to ensure robust representation to all levels of government on issues that impact their communities.  The organisation is self-funded, nonpartisan and nonsectarian.

History
The first Country Women's Association in Australia was formed on 20 April 1922 at a bushwomen's conference held in Sydney, to coincide with the Sydney Royal Easter Show. The three-day conference was organised by a committee formed by The Sydney Stock and Station Journal women's editor, Florence Gordon, with support from her newspaper and Sydney politician Dr Richard Arthur, who first conceived the idea of the conference in 1919 because of growing concerns about the poor quality of life and limited services available to women and children living in the country.  The organising committee was chaired by Grace Emily Munro who was elected founding President of what became the Country Women's Association of New South Wales.

The Queensland Country Women's Association (QCWA) was formed five months later, in August 1922, at another bushwomen's conference held in Brisbane. Its founding president was Ruth Fairfax, who played a remarkable role in the development of the CWA in both Queensland and NSW, and the Associated Country Women of the World. The CWA of Western Australia followed in 1924. South Australia followed in 1926, initially as the "Burra Country Women's Service Association" with Mary Jane Warnes as its founder and first President. A metropolitan branch was formed in Adelaide in 1928. The CWA of Victoria was formed in 1928, and the first branch in the Northern Territory was created in 1933, with the CWA of Tasmania following in 1936.

During the depression years, the CWA helped those in need with food and clothing parcels. During World War II, CWA played a significant role in supporting the war effort, establishing a reputation for being reliable at a time of national crisis. Members made tens of thousands of camouflage nets and sheepskin vests for the military, reconditioned uniforms, knitted and baked comforts for the troops, catered for troop trains and recreation huts, and established the first Servicewomen's Club in Sydney.  In Sydney, they supplied volunteers on Mondays at the St Andrew's Cathedral recreation hut. In 1992, the CWA of Australia was awarded the RSL Anzac Peace Prize in recognition of their outstanding effort in promoting international understanding and contributing to world peace in accordance with best traditions exemplified by the ANZAC spirit.

Princess Elizabeth and Philip Mountbatten's wedding cake
Princess Elizabeth and Philip Mountbatten were offered many cakes from well-wishers around the world  for their wedding on 20 November 1947. Of these they accepted only 12, including one from the Country Women's Association. 

They created a six-tiered wedding cake that stood 1.5m high. The tiers represented the six federated States, each of which donated ingredients. The finished cake was decorated with the Australian coat-of-arms on each side, plus sprigs of silver bracken fern, wedding bells and a spray of fresh white flowers in a silver vase on the top.

The icing, spiced with rum from Bundaberg, Queensland, was made by D de Mars, an instructor in cake decoration at East Sydney Technical College. He spent eight days inlaying the four plaques of the Australian coat-of-arms at the base of the cake. It was baked in Sydney by the head chef at David Jones, Sydney’s leading department store.

The six tiers were flown to London in separate airtight tins in October 1947, for the wedding the following month. At least one of the tiers was damaged en route when the plane carrying the cake landed at Lydda Airport (now Ben Gurion Airport) in Israel. The local police called in pastry chef Shaul Petrushka,
who made good the damage before the cake continued its journey to London.

Education, health and wellbeing
The CWA awards student scholarships; as well as providing instruction and encouraging participation in the fields of drama, art, music, public speaking, cooking and floral art.  The organisation runs workshops for older members on how to use computers, electronic banking and ATMs.  Submissions are made to governments at all levels on a wide variety of social issues.  Despite the organisation's involvement in a range of issues and activities, the association with cooking, in particular scones persists.  Seen as part of the local community in many parts of Australia, and its culture the CWA provides cross-generational support for women's, and children's, health and wellbeing.

Property and funding issues
The CWA owns a range of properties built and maintained by members.  In recent years there has been some controversy concerning the sale of the organisation's bush community halls.  Due to CWA being entirely self funded, unlike men's sheds, some individual branches did not have enough members to continue paying for their upkeep, including council rates, insurance, electricity, water and maintenance.  Nine halls were sold in New South Wales between 2003 and 2005, including halls at Cowra, Ettalong Beach and Jindabyne.

CWA of Australia 
The idea of creating a federal body bringing together the various State associations was first discussed in 1929, with the idea put on hold until 1945 when the CWA of Australia was formed at a meeting of State presidents in Melbourne. In the initial years, states took it turn about to chair the CWAA and host annual meetings. Victorian President Mrs E.G. Marfell was elected first chair. South Australia and its President, Mrs Helen Withers, carried the mantle the following year and then, in June 1947, Bertha Mac Smith from NSW took on the role. From 1948 the changeover happened biennially. Over the years various changes were made to the constitution to make it more effective, while preserving the autonomy of member Associations. Significant change came in 1983, when new rules stipulated that the National President would be elected; in 1985 former NSW State President Dorothy Ross became the first elected president of CWA after a national ballot.

The CWA of Australia officially ceased to operate in early 2022, with the organisation explaining that this was (in part) as a consequence of increasingly enhanced avenues of communication, which meant a single point of contact was perceived to no longer be required. In a statement issued at the time, it said the member associations had increased capacity to advocate on the issues of concern to their members, however limited resources did not allow for duplication of this capacity at a national level.

Queensland Chapter (QCWA) 

The Queensland Chapter was formed on 11 August 1922 at Albert Hall, Brisbane. Ruth Beatrice Fairfax was elected the first President. This chapter celebrates 100 years of continuous service in Queensland on 11 August 2022.

The first meeting of the Toowoomba branch was held at the Town Hall on 12 September 1922. Mrs Ruth Fairfax attended and spoke about the objectives of the organisation. The meeting resolved to hold a conference as soon as there were sufficient representatives to attend.

The Queensland chapter was inducted into the Queensland Business Leaders Hall of Fame in 2013.

In 2017, the QWCA created its own perfume, '1922', to mark its 95th anniversary. It was released at 2017 Ekka and was developed by Damask Perfumery in Brisbane. The artwork and branding of the bottle was supplied by Brisbane watercolour artist Michelle Grayson.

Documentary
A 2007 ABC-TV documentary Not All Tea and Scones, written and directed by Carmel Travers and dealing predominantly with the NSW branch, has been released on DVD by Roadshow Entertainment.

Gallery

See also

Associated Country Women of the World
Country Women's Association of Western Australia
Feminism in Australia
Taking Tea (sculpture) - a sculpture honouring the work of the CWA in Dumbleyung, Western Australia

References

External links

Country Women's Association of NSW
Country Women's Association of Victoria
Country Women's Association of WA
South Australian Country Women's Association
Country Women's Association in Tasmania
Country Women's Association Northern Territory
Country Women's Association Queensland

 
Women's organisations based in Australia
1922 establishments in Australia
Organizations established in 1922
National Rural Health Alliance organisations